Szalonna is a village in Hungary, in the Borsod-Abaúj-Zemplén county.

In the village there is an old architectural example of Romanesque art: the church. It consists of two parts. The older is the rotunda on the east side of the recent building, which is younger, but of Árpád age - the village Romanesque church with murals. The rotunda has several relatives of this type in the Carpathian Basin: Herencsény, Bagod-Szentpál, Hidegség. A group of such extended rotunda old churches have a specific characteristic: the six folded inner structure of Karcsa, Gerény and Kiszombor.

Etymology
The name probably comes from Slavic Slověna (Slověn: Slav, maybe a personal name, see also Slověnice). Slověna > Solona > Salona. 1249 Zolouna, Zolovna.

References

Bibliography
 Gerevich T.: Magyarország románkori emlékei. (Die romanische Denkmäler Ungarns.) Egyetemi nyomda. Budapest, 1938. 843 p. --- 32–33. p., LXXXVI. tábla bal alsó kép.
 Gervers-Molnár V.: A középkori Magyarország rotundái. (Romanesque Round Churches of Medieval Hungary.) (Mûvészettörténeti Füzetek, 4.) Akadémiai Kiadó. Budapest, 1972.
 Gerő, L. (1984): Magyar műemléki ABC. (Hungarian Architectural Heritage ABC.) Budapest
 Henszlmann, I. (1876): Magyarország ó-keresztyén, román és átmeneti stylü mű-emlékeinek rövid ismertetése, (Old-Christian, Romanesque and Transitional Style Architecture in Hungary). Királyi Magyar Egyetemi Nyomda, Budapest

External links 
 Street map 

Populated places in Borsod-Abaúj-Zemplén County
Romanesque architecture in Hungary